Tom Crebbin (born 22 June 1964) is a former Australian rules footballer who played with Richmond and St Kilda in the Victorian Football League (VFL).

Crebbin, who went to Haileybury College, played his early football at Berwick. A midfielder, Crebbin made seven appearances for Richmond in the 1985 VFL season, debuting in round 13. He then joined St Kilda, but would only play one league game for the club, against Carlton at Princes Park in 1986.

References

1964 births
Australian rules footballers from Victoria (Australia)
Richmond Football Club players
St Kilda Football Club players
Living people